Mush and Milk is a comedy short subject; part of the Our Gang (Little Rascals) series. It was produced and directed by Robert F. McGowan for Hal Roach, and was originally released to theaters by Metro-Goldwyn-Mayer on May 27, 1933. It was the 123rd Our Gang short to be released overall, and the 35th to include sound.

Plot
The children live in the Bleak Hill boarding school, whose ghastly old headmistress constantly punishes and berates them. As they wake up one morning, having improvised a variety of methods to keep warm in their beds, she orders them to get to their chores or face a beating and no breakfast. Her husband, the kindly old Cap, serves as the children's schoolteacher. He promises them that once his back pension comes in, he will take them away from the school so they can all live well.

The children milk a cow using a vacuum cleaner, but their dog Pete knocks over the bucket. To avoid punishment, they mix powdered plaster of Paris into a bucket of water so that the headmistress will think it is milk. At breakfast, they pass the word among themselves not to drink the milk, making up an excuse that it has spoiled. When Spanky innocently tells the headmistress, she scolds the children and orders them to put the milk on their mush and eat it. The plaster quickly sets up, leaving them with slabs of plaster and mush in their bowls and stuck on their spoons.

Cap leads the children through a class session of humorously inaccurate questions and answers, then has them put on an impromptu talent show that culminates in Tommy belting out a rendition of "Just Friends" with adult-oriented lyrics. Spanky answers a telephone call during class; it is Mr. Brown, the bank manager, who wants to speak to Cap. Following a comical exchange, Mr. Brown gets Spanky to put Cap on the line and tells him that his back pension has come in, totaling nearly $4,000. Cap, ecstatic, treats the children to an amusement park visit, a wide variety of toys, and dinner at a fancy French restaurant. He orders a meal for everyone, not knowing exactly what it is. The food turns out to be mush, which Cap throws in the waiter's face out of disgust.

Cast

The Gang
 Matthew Beard as Stymie
 Tommy Bond as Tommy
 Dorothy DeBorba as Dorothy
 Bobby Hutchins as Wheezer
 George McFarland as Spanky
 Dickie Moore as Dick
 John Collum as Uh-huh
 Edith Fellows as Girl in kitchen
 Bill Farnum as Billy
 Dickie Jackson as Dickie
 Marcia Mae Jones as Our Gang member
 Olga Therkow as Olga
 Pete the Pup as himself

Additional cast
 Gus Leonard as Cap, teacher
 Louise Emmons as Cap's wife, the Headmistress
 James Finlayson as Mr. Brown, the banker
 Rolfe Sedan as Waiter
 Joe the Monk as Monkey

Production notes
Mush and Milk marked the last appearances of  Bobby Hutchins, Dorothy DeBorba, Dickie Jackson (Mary Ann Jackson's brother), and Dickie Moore in the Our Gang series. Wheezer was the last regular full-time Our Ganger left from the silent era.
Mush and Milk was the last Our Gang episode to exclusively use music scores by Leroy Shield. Bedtime Worries, the next episode would begin to incorporate scenes without music and focus more on dialogue than films from previous years. The look and feel of the series would begin changing the next season.
While the gang are students at Bleak Hill Boarding School, the environment seems more like an orphanage and the film appears to be portraying the kids as orphans rather than students.
This film was edited due to negative treatment towards children and negative, stereotypical misconceptions of old people from syndicated Little Rascals television package in 1971. The edited portions were reinstated in 2001 on AMC and aired there from 2001 to 2003.

See also
 Our Gang filmography

References

External links
 
 
 

1933 films
1933 comedy films
Films directed by Robert F. McGowan
American black-and-white films
Hal Roach Studios short films
Our Gang films
Films with screenplays by H. M. Walker
1933 short films
1930s English-language films
1930s American films